Edbrooke is a surname. Notable people with the surname include:

Frank E. Edbrooke (1840–1921), American architect
Harry W.J. Edbrooke (1873–1946), American architect
Paul Edbrooke (born 1978), Australian politician
Roger Edbrooke (born 1960), English cricketer
Willoughby J. Edbrooke (1843–1896), American architect

Nicole Edbrooke (born 1970), University Challenge finalist